The Pittsburgh Botanic Garden is a botanical garden in Settler's Cabin Park in the Pittsburgh suburbs of Collier Township and North Fayette Township, United States. The garden spans across a total of 452 acres, making it among the top 10 largest American botanical gardens.

History 

According to their descendant Elizabeth in 2010, the McGill family had owned the acres since the mid-1800s. In 1971, the family sold about 85 of them to Allegheny County towards what would become Settler's Cabin Park, but because the county had more land than they needed for the park, it offered the McGills' parcel in the late 1990s to a Florida developer for a golf course.

Around the same time Mr. Frank Pizzi, curator of horticulture and grounds at the Pittsburgh Zoo; Ms. Lindsay Bond Totten, who would become the botanic garden's president until 2008; and three or four others founded the Horticultural Society of Western Pennsylvania in 1988. Its mission was to promote and encourage horticulture and botany, the conservation of natural resources and the establishment of a botanical garden in western Pennsylvania.

Their dreams for a garden came true a few years later. "When those plans [for the golf course] fell through, county Commissioner Larry Dunn offered it and adjoining land to the botanic garden."

The organization became a 501(c)(3) non-profit corporation in 1991 and adopted its current name in 2010.

Pittsburgh Botanic Garden is region's first comprehensive outdoor botanic garden focusing on hardy plants adaptable to the soils and climate in Western Pennsylvania.

Construction and Restoration

Water Treatment

No sooner had the society received the land than "they discovered the unseen damage that nearly a century of underground and strip coal mining and oil wells had done to the land. In 2004, Hurricane Ivan flooded the mines, and drove home just how bad it was, with acid mine drainage and subsidence. Experts said it would require years and millions of dollars in mine reclamation and remediation to create a garden that could use on-site water."

To try to cut down on these expenses the garden's board applied for government and foundation grants and sought to find a company "that could remove the remaining coal while also reclaiming the land and treating the acidic groundwater." In 2008, Mashuda Corporation was hired for this purpose.

In 2012, "the passive acid mine drainage treatment system was constructed to restore the Woodland Gardens pond." That same year "a 400,000 gallon underground cistern was constructed to supplement the garden’s future irrigation system and eliminate dependence on municipal water." In addition, Mashuda Corporation transferred its permit for reclamation work on the abandoned coalmines to Cherep Excavating, who resumed the work in May.

Reuse of Historic Structures

The welcome center, named after board member Bayer Materials Science, is housed in a barn built in the 1870s. The plan was to include an educational classroom, an orientation space, and public restrooms. The barn's upper floor will be available for weddings, along with an "elaborately planted courtyard and over-sized outdoor fireplace."

Across the street from the welcome center and next to the parking lot, a farmhouse will be converted into the garden's offices.

Reforestation

"Since 2010, approximately 20 acres have been cleared of invasive species, and over 5,200 native trees, shrubs and herbaceous perennials have been planted."

Facilities

The groundbreaking ceremony took place on Tuesday, August 1, 2006. The garden will be completed and opened to the public in three main stages.

Phase One

Phase One, the biggest of the master plan, is expected to be completed by 2015 at a cost of $30 million.

This phase consists of the aforementioned visitors center, auto gardens (parking lots), a family garden including the Fred Rogers Garden of Make Believe, and a 40-acre area designated as the "Woodlands of the World". This area will be divided into five geographically distinct gardens, including: an Appalachian Plateau and Cove Forest; an Eastern European forest featuring a 25-foot dragon made out of cob "to remind visitors of the birthplace of many of our favorite fairy tales"; an English forest; and a lotus pond surrounded by a Japanese garden. The latter will be designed by Keiji Uesugi who with his father Takeo had previously developed the gardens at the Japanese American Cultural and Community Center in Los Angeles and the Huntington Library, Art Collections and Botanical Gardens in San Marino.

Production and Research Center

In 2011, the Sprout Tree Nursery, complete with greenhouse, storage shed and composter, was built as part of the planned Production and Research Center. According to the garden's website, "the Sprout Nursery allows us to optimize our plant stock and take advantage of the lower priced younger trees. We are nurturing seedlings of the new hybrid American Chestnut strain, entrusted to us in 2011. We also have Black Walnuts, American Beech, Tulip Poplar and a variety of oaks, in addition to espaliered apple trees." The nursery is supported with a solar-powered irrigation system.

Historic Homestead

"The orchard sits between the 1784 log cabin that once belonged to Isaac Walker (a Revolutionary War veteran) and a farmhouse built in 1855.

Using the remnants of the two-acre orchard dating to the 1880s, we planted young saplings with ancient lineages. One of the species planted dates back to the 1500s and another dates back to 1790 and produced Thomas Jefferson’s favorite apple!" There are plans for split-rail fencing around the orchard and the individual saplings.

A "historically representative as well as highly interactive and educational" pioneer garden was built near the log cabin in 2014.

Dogwood Meadow

With grants from the Garden Club of Allegheny County, an eight-acre meadow "features over 550 native white-flowering dogwood trees, now an exceptional and rare collection due to ravages of disease over the past 25 years. This spring display is augmented with spring flowering bulbs and spring blooming native shrubs and perennials."

This meadow is located between the Woodlands of the World and the above historic homestead. Within this area a gazebo and an ornamental garden with a seating area will be constructed for weddings, parties and classes.

Other Buildings

There are also plans for an amphitheater for outdoor performances and a total of 18 thematically distinct gardens.

See also 
 List of botanical gardens in the United States

References 

 Essential Public Radio
 Pennsylvania Landscape and Nursery Magazine
 Fine Gardening Magazine

External links
 Pittsburgh Botanic Garden

Botanical gardens in Pennsylvania
Geography of Pittsburgh
Tourist attractions in Pittsburgh